The 1902 Utah Agricultural Aggies football team was an American football team that represented Utah Agricultural College (later renamed Utah State University) during the 1902 college football season. In their first season under head coach George P. Campbell, the Aggies compiled a 0–5–1. The team's captain was Aquila "Quill" Nebeker Jr.

Schedule

References

Utah Agricultural
Utah State Aggies football seasons
College football winless seasons
Utah Agricultural football team